Lalu Leela was a Malayalam comic magazine published from Kottayam, Kerala.

The magazine is considered as one of the pioneering children's magazines in Malayalam.

References

Children's magazines published in India
Defunct magazines published in India
Indian comics
Magazines about comics
Magazines with year of disestablishment missing
Magazines with year of establishment missing
Malayalam comics
Malayalam-language magazines
Mass media in Kerala